Tin al-Sabil  is a Syrian village located in Ayn Halaqim Nahiyah in Masyaf District, Hama.  According to the Syria Central Bureau of Statistics (CBS), Tin al-Sabil had a population of 562 in the 2004 census.

References 

Populated places in Masyaf District